Guido Anzile (26 September 1928 – 4 March 2022) was an Italian-born French cyclist. He was the brother of fellow cyclist Ugo Anzile and the nephew of Gino Sciardis. Anzile died on 4 March 2022, at the age of 93.

Major results
1954
 3rd Overall Circuit des Ardennes
1955
 3rd Genoa–Nice
1956
 1st Stage 3 Circuit de Lorraine
1958
 2nd Overall Circuit de Lorraine
 2nd Overall Circuit des Ardennes
1961
 3rd Grand Prix de la ville de Nogent-sur-Oise (1961)
1962
 1st Overall Circuit de Lorraine
 1st Stages 1 & 3

References

External links
 

1928 births
2022 deaths
French male cyclists
Italian emigrants to France
People from the Province of Udine
Naturalized citizens of France
Cyclists from Friuli Venezia Giulia